Sphingopyxis solisilvae is a Gram-negative, rod-shaped and motile  bacterium from the genus of Sphingopyxis which has been isolated from forest soil from the Kyonggi University in Korea.

References

Sphingomonadales
Bacteria described in 2017